The Bargain is a 1914 American silent Western film starring William S. Hart. It was the first feature film starring Hart, who would go on to become the most popular Western actor of the silent film era. In 2010, it was one of the 25 films added to the National Film Registry of the Library of Congress for “culturally, historically or aesthetically” significant and to be preserved for all time. The second Hart Western to be named to the National Film Registry  (after Hell's Hinges in 1994), The Bargain was said to have been selected because of Hart’s charisma, the film’s authenticity and realistic portrayal of the Western genre.

Cast
 William S. Hart as Jim Stokes
 J. Frank Burke as Sheriff Bud Walsh
 Clara Williams as Nell Brent
 J. Barney Sherry as Phil Brent
 Joseph J. Dowling as Reverend Joshua Wilkes

Production
A portion of The Bargain was filmed at the Grand Canyon in Arizona.

Reissues
In 1918, a revised version of the film was submitted for review by the Chicago Board of Censors that had scenes in which the Sheriff released a prisoner to holdup gamblers and associated intertitles were eliminated, and new intertitles and scenes with newspaper articles stating that the sheriff and bandit had paid the penalty for their crimes had been inserted. A version cut from 7 to 5 reels was distributed prior to 1920, and in 1920 Hart's production company released it under the title The Two-Gun Man in the Bargain.

References

External links
 The Bargain essay by Brian Taves at National Film Registry. 
 Thomas Ince: Hollywood's Independent Pioneer (University Press of Kentucky, 2012) by Brian Taves, pages 66–68,  
 
 

1914 films
1914 Western (genre) films
American black-and-white films
Films directed by Reginald Barker
Silent American Western (genre) films
Surviving American silent films
United States National Film Registry films
1910s American films
1910s English-language films